Senator Green may refer to:

Members of the United States Senate
James S. Green (1817–1870), U.S. Senator from Missouri
Theodore F. Green (1867–1966), U.S. Senator from Rhode Island from 1937 to 1961

United States state senate members
Byram Green (1786–1865), New York State Senate
Duff Green (1791–1875), Missouri State Senate
Gene Green (born 1947), Texas State Senate
George E. Green (1858–1917), New York State Senate
Henry Dickinson Green (1857–1929), Pennsylvania State Senate
J. Herbert Green (1860–?), Wisconsin State Senate
John Aloysius Green (1844–1920), Iowa State Senate
John Patterson Green (1845–1940), Ohio State Senate
John Green (judge) (1807–1887), Indiana State Senate
Josh Green (politician) (born 1970), Hawaii State Senate
Lyda Green (born 1938), Alaska State Senate
Mark E. Green (born 1964), Tennessee State Senate
Mike Green (Michigan politician) (born 1948), Michigan State Senate
Mike Green (West Virginia politician) (born 1973), West Virginia State Senate
Reed Green (politician) (1865–1937), Illinois State Senate
Sanford M. Green (1807–1901), Michigan State Senate
Thomas Jefferson Green (1802–1863), California State Senate and Senate of the Republic of Texas
Timothy P. Green (born 1963), Missouri State Senate
Warren Green (1869–1945), South Dakota State Senate
William Green (U.S. labor leader) (1873–1952), Ohio State Senate

See also
Senator Greene (disambiguation)